Jiaomendong is a station on Line 10 of the Beijing Subway. The phase II of Line 10 entered in operation on December 30, 2012. However, this station did not open on that day, and Line 10 skipped this station. The station opened on 5 May 2013.

Station Layout 
The station has an underground island platform.

Exits 
There are 5 exits, lettered A, B, C, D1, and D2. Exit C is accessible.

References

Railway stations in China opened in 2013
Beijing Subway stations in Fengtai District